Rend Lake is a  long,  wide reservoir located in Southern Illinois in Franklin and Jefferson Counties near the town of Benton. It contains 18,900 acres (76 km2) of water, stores  of water, and supplies over 15 million gallons of water per day to 300,000 persons in over 60 communities.

Rend Lake was created when the United States Army Corps of Engineers dammed the Big Muddy River. The dam and lake were authorized in 1962, but the lake was not completely filled until March 1973.

The shoreline of Rend Lake extends 162 miles (261 km), part of which is preserved as Wayne Fitzgerrell State Recreation Area. Swimming beaches at North Marcum and South Sandusky are managed and maintained by the US Army Corps of Engineers. An adjacent Illinois Artisans Shop & Visitors Center is part of the Illinois State Museum system and is operated by the Illinois Department of Natural Resources.

In 2010, Rend Lake was designated as an Important Bird Area of Illinois.

Fishing 
Rend Lake is one of the largest lakes in Illinois and is home to some of the top ranked fishing. Recognized species in Rend Lake are the following :

References

Reservoirs in Illinois
Protected areas of Franklin County, Illinois
Protected areas of Jefferson County, Illinois
Bodies of water of Franklin County, Illinois
Bodies of water of Jefferson County, Illinois
1973 establishments in Illinois